Mary Marshall Seaver is an American slalom canoeist who competed from the late 1990s to the mid-2000s. She won a silver medal in the K-1 team event at the 1999 ICF Canoe Slalom World Championships in La Seu d'Urgell.

References
 
 

American female canoeists
Living people
Year of birth missing (living people)
Medalists at the ICF Canoe Slalom World Championships